Kavangoland was a bantustan in South West Africa (present-day Namibia), intended by the apartheid government to be a self-governing homeland for the Kavango people. It was set up in 1970 and self-government was granted in 1973. The Kavango Legislative Council had its administrative headquarters in Rundu; its first session opened in October 1970 in the presence of the South African Minister for Bantu Administration and Development.

Kavangoland, like other homelands in South West Africa, was abolished in May 1989 at the start of the transition to independence.

The Democratic Turnhalle Alliance (DTA) ruled Kavangoland from 1981 to 1989.

References

See also
Apartheid
Leaders of Kavangoland

History of Namibia
Bantustans in South West Africa
States and territories established in 1970
Kavango people
States and territories disestablished in 1989
1970 establishments in South West Africa